Paul-Émile Léger  (April 26, 1904 – November 13, 1991) was a Canadian Cardinal of the Roman Catholic Church. He served as Archbishop of Montreal from 1950 to 1967, and was elevated to the cardinalate in 1953 by Pope Pius XII.

Early life and education 
Paul-Émile Léger was born April 26, 1904, in Salaberry-de-Valleyfield, Quebec to Ernest Léger, a general merchant, and Alda Beauvais. He grew up in Saint-Anicet, where he served as an altar boy with his brother, Jules, and attended elementary school. He studied at Petit Séminaire de Sainte-Thérèse from 1916 to 1925, which was interrupted due to illness for almost four years beginning in January 1920. From 1925 to 1929 he studied theology at the Grand Séminaire de Montréal. Léger entered the Jesuit novitiate at Sault-au-Récollet, but was regarded as too emotional to continue in that order. Léger was transferred to the Valleyfield diocese after becoming ordained as a priest on May 25, 1929.

Léger's first assignment was as a priest in the parish of Notre-Dame in Montreal. After joining the Society of Saint-Sulpice in September 1929 he was sent to its noviciate in Issy-les-Moulineaux for his period of solitude in 1929–1930. He then spent a year at the Institut Catholique de Paris studying canon law. Léger then taught this for a year after earning his bachelor's degree in 1931. He then become assistant master at the noviciate the following year.

Japan mission 
Léger returned to Canada to visit his parents in 1933. Later that year he left Montreal for Fukuoka, Japan, to set up a grand séminaire for educating indigenous clergy. Léger rapidly became established as a preacher and spent his first year mastering Japanese. After ten months of being in Japan, he became curé of the cathedral in Tokyo. He left that post, drained, in August 1935. The goal of the mission remained the same, but Léger faced a number of major obstacles. Although the diocese was founded in 1927 and had less than 10,000 Catholics, nothing was organized. He returned to Canada from December 1935 to October 1936 to advertise his missionary work. He remained in Japan until the beginning of World War II.

Appointments and posts 
He was professor of sociology in Montreal and professor of apologetics at the Pius XI Institute from 1939 to 1940.

In 1940 Léger became the vicar general of the Diocese of Valleyfield, and the parish priest at St. Cecilia Cathedral. He had to temporarily leave the Society of Saint-Sulpice. He held these posts until 1947 when he was named rector of the Canadian Pontifical College in Rome. He was affectionately received by Pope Pius XII due to the aid Gold Cross, a Quebec charity Léger founded, was providing to Rome after the war.

Léger was appointed archbishop of Montreal on March 25, 1950  by Pope Pius XII, and was raised to the rank of Monsignor on September 29, 1942. He was appointed a cardinal on November 29, 1952, one of the youngest in recent history. On January 12, 1953, he was given the honor of wearing the red hat, the first in Montreal. In this capacity he would perform the duties of the papal legate in Lourdes, France (1954), at St Joseph's Oratory in Montreal (1955), and in Sainte-Anne-de-Beaupré (1958). Léger was named a member of the Central Preparatory Commission on June 15, 1960.

Later career 
Léger put emphasis on the importance of love over procreation. He was also concerned with fathers being responsible. His most compelling speeches are collected in Trente textes du cardinal Léger qui ont marqué l'Église au concile et au Québec. Léger argued for more freedom of opinion. His views aligned with Pope John XXIII, who advocated for aggiornamento. His work on the Central Preparatory Commission led to close affiliations with other cardinals leading edge of modernization in the Church. In August 1962, Léger, disappointed in the preparatory schemata of the first conciliar period, petitioned John XXIII along with six of the leading European cardinals.

Léger stood out as a leader during the Second Vatican Council (1962–1965) even though his positions cost him some friendships and made him some enemies. His activity mainly focused on ecumenism; family, including procreation and marriage; freedom of thought within the Church; the liturgy; religious freedom; and the place of the Holy Scriptures in the Church. Despite his prominence and popularity at the Council, his rigid stances created rivalries, including with some that supported secularization, liberalization and modernization of the Church.

From late December 1963 to early January 1964 Léger returned to his missionary work, travelling to Africa. After returning to Canada, he wanted to help leprosaria with his Fame Pereo charity. He began to divest some personal belongings to help the poor. He even went as far as to propose he leave his see in Montreal to apply himself to missionary work, but Paul VI rejected it.

Léger with the Quebec bishops and Archbishop Roy delicately negotiated with the government, resulting in major institutional revamping in education, health, and social services. Notably, Bill 60 led to the Department of Education's establishment in 1964. Léger saved the Church contention with the government of Quebec by adopting conservative and equitable stances.

After the Council ended, Léger returned to the norm of overseeing his archdiocese. He faced resistance from Quiet Revolution forces when trying to implement aggiornamento. It was difficult to work with the clergy in his archdiocese, and his relationships with fellow bishops were strained. Léger engaged in Church administration as a member of the Sacred Congregation for the Discipline of the Sacraments, the Sacred Congregation of Rites, the Sacred Consistorial Congregation, the Fabric of Saint Peter, the Pontifical Commission for the Revision of the Code of Canon Law, and the first assembly of the Synod of Bishops (1967). By 1967 Archbishop Roy took Léger's spot as Pope Paul VI's special Canada representative.

On November 9, 1967, Léger announced his resignation as archbishop of Montreal with the intent to devote himself to working among the African lepers. This decision caused an uproar in the media and surprised the public. Léger was enthralled with Africa. There were challenges and complexities with the changing landscape of Church in Montreal, including increased population and lack of proportional increase of staff and implementation of the Vatican's directives.

Léger left Montreal on December 11, 1967, making some short stops, visiting leprosaria supported by Fame Pereo, before settling in the archdiocese of Yaoundé, Cameroon. There he established around 40 aid projects. Until 1979 he dedicated himself almost completely to his ministry, interrupted by two trips back to Montreal. He served on the Pontifical Commission for Migrants and Tourism (1972–79) and on the Sacred Congregation for the Evangelization of Peoples (1972–84).

Death 
In July 1984 Léger was admitted to Séminaire de Saint-Sulpice and spent his last two years confined to a wheelchair before dying at age 87 on November 13, 1991. He was the last surviving cardinal created by Pius XII.

Views

Role during the Second Vatican Council 
The cardinal was a leading liberal force at the Second Vatican Council (1962–1965). With the assistance of Cardinals Antonio Caggiano and Norman Gilroy, he delivered one of the closing messages of the council on December 8, 1965.

Religious liberty 
He supported religious liberty at the council.

Birth control 
He was one of the council fathers who, in a speech delivered on October 29, 1964, concerning the document later promulgated as the Constitution on the Church in the Modern World, Gaudium et Spes, raised the question of a possible change in the Church's teaching on birth control.  In the same speech, he urged that the document place more emphasis on conjugal love as an end or purpose of marriage.

Antisemitism 
He believed that the council fathers needed to issue a stronger declaration against antisemitism as a "necessary act of a renewed Church".

Ecumenism 
A cardinal elector in the 1963 papal conclave, Léger spoke at a session of the Faith and Order Commission in September 1963.

Honours 
  Grand Cross of the Order or Merit, Portugal (1965)
  Companion of the Order of Canada, Canada (1968)
  Grand Officer of the National Order of Quebec, Quebec, Canada (1969)
 Received the Loyola Medal from Loyola College, one of Concordia University's founding institutions (1967)
  Grande Croix of the Légion d'honneur, France (1958)
 Pearson Peace Medal (1969)
 Prix Maisonneuve, Société Saint-Jean-Baptiste of Montréal (1983)

References

External links 
 Pearson Medal of Peace – Cardinal Paul-Émile Cardinal Léger

1904 births
1991 deaths
Cardinals created by Pope Pius XII
Participants in the Second Vatican Council
Roman Catholic archbishops of Montreal
Canadian cardinals
Grand Officers of the National Order of Quebec
Companions of the Order of Canada
People from Salaberry-de-Valleyfield
20th-century Roman Catholic archbishops in Canada
Amateur radio people
Members of the Sacred Consistorial Congregation
Sulpician bishops